The 2012–13 División de Honor B, the XV edition, began on October 13, 2012 with the first matchday of regular season and finished on May 5, 2013 with the Promotion playoffs final.

Competition format
The regular season runs through 18 matchdays. Upon completion the regular season, the two top teams of each group play a promotion playoff consisting of semifinal and final. The final winner is promoted to División de Honor while the loser team play the promotion playoff against the team qualified 11th in División de Honor. Teams in 9th & 10th standings play the relegation playoff to Primera Nacional.

Each win means 4 points to winning team.
A draw means 2 points for each team.
1 bonus point for a team that achieves 4 tries in a match.
A defeat by 7 or less points means 1 bonus point for defeated team.

2012–13 season teams

Group A
Teams from northern section of Spain

Hercesa moved to Group B.

Final standings

Source: Federación Española de Rugby

Group B
Teams from southern section of Spain

Final standings

Source: Federación Española de Rugby

Promotion playoffs

Semifinals

1st leg

2nd leg

Alcobendas won 48–37 on aggregate and advanced to Final.

Bathco Independiente won 78–26 on aggregate and advanced to Final.

Final
Winning team will be promoted to División de Honor for 2013–14 season. Loser team will get a new chance to achieve promotion, playing a playoff against Hernani CRE for a single spot in División de Honor.

1st leg

2nd leg

Bathco Independiente won 25–21 on aggregate and got promoted to División de Honor.

See also
 2012–13 División de Honor de Rugby
 División de Honor B de Rugby

References

External links
División de Honor B standings
División de Honor B scores

2012–13
B